Bushwood is a hamlet in Warwickshire, located three miles north of Henley in Arden and a mile west of the M40 motorway. There is no village centre as such because all the buildings in the hamlet are spread out so widely. It is named after the wood, Bush Wood, that runs through the centre of the area. The Stratford-on-Avon Canal runs along the eastern edge of the settlement. Population details can be found under Rowington.

"Bushwood" is a corruption of byssopswode or Bishop's Wood, which refers to its former ownership by the bishops of Worcester, dating back to the 9th century.  The wood itself is an ancient deer park, with an earthwork along its lower boundary.

The manor house, Bushwood Hall, is located at the northern end of the settlement. The current building is adjacent to the site of a previous medieval structure built in 1314, of which there remains no visible evidence above ground; however the moat remains intact and contains water all the way round.

Villages in Warwickshire